Dukes County is a county located in the U.S. state of Massachusetts. As of the 2020 census, the population was 20,600, making it the second-least populous county in Massachusetts. Its county seat is Edgartown.

Dukes County comprises the Vineyard Haven, MA Micropolitan Statistical Area. The county consists of the island of Martha's Vineyard (including Chappaquiddick Island), the Elizabeth Islands (including Cuttyhunk), the island of Nomans Land, and other associated islets.

History

The original inhabitants of the islands were Wampanoag, who had several villages. Political jurisdiction over the lands were granted by the English monarchy in overlapping claims to two different British nobles, from which Massachusetts Bay Company settler Thomas Mayhew purchased them in 1641. Mayhew established a colony in his new domain, carefully purchasing land ownership rights from the native inhabitants, and maintaining native governments to continue unimpeded. In 1665, Mayhew's lands were included in a grant to James, Duke of York (later King James II). In 1671, a settlement was arranged, allowing Mayhew to continue to rule while placing his territory under the jurisdiction of the Province of New York.

Dukes County was thus established as Dukes County, New York, on November 1, 1683, and included all of Mayhew's lands – Martha's Vineyard, Nantucket, and the Elizabeth Islands. The county was transferred to Massachusetts on October 7, 1691, and at the same time Nantucket Island was split into the separate Nantucket County, Massachusetts. The 1695 incorporation statute created a county "by the name of Dukes County," as opposed to the standard form "the county of Dukes" which is the reason for the redundancy in the formal name, "County of Dukes County".

Geography
It is the third-smallest county by land area in Massachusetts.

Nearby counties
Barnstable County, Massachusetts – northeast
Plymouth County, Massachusetts – north
Bristol County, Massachusetts – northwest
Nantucket County, Massachusetts – east

National protected area
 Nomans Land Island National Wildlife Refuge

Demographics

2020 Census

Note: the US Census treats Hispanic/Latino as an ethnic category. This table excludes Latinos from the racial categories and assigns them to a separate category. Hispanics/Latinos can be of any race.

2010 census
At the 2010 census, there were 16,535 people, 7,368 households, and 4,221 families living in the county. The racial makeup of the county was 87.6% white, 3.1% black or African American, 1.1% American Indian, 0.8% Asian, 0.1% Pacific islander, 3.9% from other races, and 3.4% from two or more races. Those of Hispanic or Latino origin made up 2.3% of the population.

The largest ancestry groups were:

 18.5% Irish
 17.1% English
 11.7% Portuguese
 10.0% American
 9.2% German
 7.6% Italian
 5.5% French
 2.9% West Indian
 2.9% Scottish
 2.5% Dutch
 2.3% Scotch-Irish
 2.1% Swedish
 2.1% Polish
 1.9% French Canadian
 1.4% Russian
 1.1% Arab
 1.0% Sub-Saharan African 

Of the 7,368 households, 25.9% had children under the age of 18 living with them, 44.1% were married couples living together, 8.9% had a female householder with no husband present, 42.7% were non-families, and 33.4% of households were made up of individuals. The average household size was 2.22 and the average family size was 2.81. The median age was 45.3 years.

The median household income was $62,407 and the median family income  was $77,231. Males had a median income of $43,850 versus $41,994 for females. The per capita income for the county was $33,390. About 5.5% of families and 8.6% of the population were below the poverty line, including 4.3% of those under age 18 and 7.2% of those age 65 or over.

2000 census
At the 2000 census there were 14,987 people, 6,421 households, and 3,788 families living in the county. There were 14,836 housing units at an average density of 143 per square mile (55/km2). The racial makeup of the county was 90.69% White, 2.40% Black or African American, 1.71% Native American, 0.46% Asian, 0.07% Pacific Islander, 1.48% from other races, and 3.19% from two or more races. 1.03% of the population were Hispanic or Latino of any race. 20.4% were of English, 13.3% Irish, 8.6% Portuguese, 6.4% Italian and 5.7% American ancestry, 93.1% spoke English, 3.7% Portuguese and 1.7% Spanish as their first language and 0.285% speak Irish at home.
Of the 6,421 households 28.40% had children under the age of 18 living with them, 45.40% were married couples living together, 9.80% had a female householder with no husband present, and 41.00% were non-families. 32.00% of households were one person and 11.10% were one person aged 65 or older. The average household size was 2.30 and the average family size was 2.91.

The age distribution was 22.70% under the age of 18, 5.50% from 18 to 24, 29.60% from 25 to 44, 27.80% from 45 to 64, and 14.40% 65 or older. The median age was 41 years. For every 100 females, there were 95.60 males. For every 100 females age 18 and over, there were 92.10 males.

The median household income was $45,559 and the median family income  was $55,018. Males had a median income of $38,945 versus $30,346 for females. The per capita income for the county was $26,472. About 5.00% of families and 7.30% of the population were below the poverty line, including 10.40% of those under age 18 and 5.30% of those age 65 or over.

Real Estate 
As of the fourth quarter 2021, the median value of homes in Dukes County was $883,820, an increase of 22.3% from the prior year.

Demographic breakdown by town

Income

The ranking of unincorporated communities that are included on the list are reflective if the census designated locations and villages were included as cities or towns. Data is from the 2007–2011 American Community Survey 5-Year Estimates.

Political affiliation

Religion

Politics
Like the state of Massachusetts, Dukes County heavily supports the Democratic Party. The last Republican Party candidate to receive over 40% of the county’s vote was Ronald Reagan in 1984, and the last Republican to win the county was Richard Nixon in 1972. Before 1964, however, the county was a stronghold of the Republicans, supporting Dwight D Eisenhower in 1956 by an especially large margin well over 50%, and was one of the few counties where William Howard Taft finished ahead of Woodrow Wilson in 1912. (See table). 

|}

Communities

Towns
Aquinnah (formerly Gay Head)
Chilmark
Edgartown (shire town or county seat)
Gosnold
Oak Bluffs
Tisbury
West Tisbury

Census-designated places
Edgartown
Oak Bluffs
Vineyard Haven

Other villages
Cuttyhunk
Menemsha

Education
School districts include:

K-12:
 Gosnold School District

Secondary:
 Martha's Vineyard School District

Elementary:
 Edgartown School District
 Oak Bluffs School District
 Tisbury School District
 Up-Island Regional School District

See also
 List of Massachusetts locations by per capita income
 Registry of Deeds (Massachusetts)
 National Register of Historic Places listings in Dukes County, Massachusetts
 USS Dukes County (LST-735)

References

External links

 
 National Register of Historic Places listing for Dukes Co., Massachusetts
 Map of cities and towns of Massachusetts

 
1695 establishments in Massachusetts
Massachusetts counties
Micropolitan areas of Massachusetts
Populated places established in 1695